The 2019 Israel State Cup Final decided the winner of the 2018–19 Israel State Cup, the 83rd season of Israel's main football cup. It was played on  15 May 2019 at the Sammy Ofer Stadium in Haifa, between Maccabi Netanya and Bnei Yehuda.

Background
Maccabi Netanya had previously played 4 Israel cup Finals, had won the competition a record 1 time. Their most recent appearance in the final was in 2014, in which they lost 1–0 to  Ironi Kiryat Shmona, and their most recent victory in the tournament was in 1978, beating Bnei Yehuda 2–1. 

Bnei Yehuda had previously played in 7 finals, winning 3. Their most recent appearance in the final was tin 2017, in which they won  4–3 on penalties against Maccabi Tel Aviv. 

Maccabi Netanya and Bnei Yehuda had played each other one time was in 1978,  Maccabi Netanya won 2-1.

The two teams played each other three times during the 2018–19 Israeli Premier League season until the final. In the first instance Bnei Yehuda won 3–1, in the two other times the games end draw 1-1 and 0-0.

Road to the final

Details

Israel State Cup
State Cup
Cup 2018
Cup 2018
Israel State Cup matches
Israel State Cup Final 2019